PD-102,807 is a drug which acts as a selective antagonist for the muscarinic acetylcholine receptor M4. It is used in scientific research for studying the effects of the different muscarinic receptor subtypes in the body and brain.

See also
 PD-0298029

References 

Muscarinic antagonists